Muncie Central High School (MCHS) in Muncie, Indiana is a public high school. As of the 2013–14 school year, it had 913 students.  Opened in 1868, the school is today part of the Muncie Community Schools Corp.

History
Opened in 1868, Muncie High School produced a first graduating class of six students. In 1881, the school was renamed Muncie Central High School, and in 1915 it moved to a four-story building on South High Street in Muncie. In the early 1920s, it was one of Indiana's first schools to adopt a mascot.

In 1974, the school moved to its present location on Walnut Street in downtown Muncie. The school was originally open concept with almost no interior walls, but it has since been remodeled to a traditional format.

After the 2013–2014 school year, Muncie Central merged with Muncie Southside High School to form one high school.

In November 2021, students at Muncie Central organized Black Lives Matter protests, held outside of the school. The controversy began after police officers working at the school were offended by a pro-BLM poster, created by a 16-year old student for a school project and hung in the hallway by a teacher. School administrators sided with the officers and took down the poster. The decision was viewed by students as a violation of their freedom of speech. The protests made Muncie Central cancel several in-person school days. The protests at Muncie Central gained nationwide media attention.

Athletics
The Muncie boys team won the Indiana High School Boys Basketball Tournament (IHSAA) in 1928, 1931, 1951, 1952, 1963, 1978, 1979 and 1988. The boys team won the IHSAA cross country tournament in 1956, 1958 and 1967. The girls volleyball team won the state tournament in 1998, 1999, 2000, 2003, 2005 and 2010.

Muncie Central High School also is the site of the Muncie Fieldhouse, the fourth-largest high school gymn in the United States.

Music
Muncie Central has a proud history of musical excellence. 
As a participant in Indiana State Fair Band Day, the Muncie Central Spirit of Muncie Band and Guard has been crowned Champion twice, in 2014 and 2021. Muncie Southside, prior to merging with Muncie Central, won five Band Day Championships, including three consecutive from 2002-2004. Muncie Southside finished first or second at the State Fair in 12 of 13 years, starting in 2000 and concluding with their final competition in 2013. 

The Spirit of Muncie finished third in 2022.

Notable alumni
 Ron Bonham: basketball player, 1960 Indiana Mr. Basketball, 2-time NCAA national champion with University of Cincinnati, drafted by Boston Celtics in 1964, 2-time NBA champion.
 Benjamin V. Cohen (attended Muncie schools through 11th grade): a member of the administrations of Franklin D. Roosevelt and Harry S. Truman; had a public service career that spanned from the early New Deal to after the Vietnam War.
 Mary Jane Croft: American actress best known for her roles as Betty Ramsey on I Love Lucy, Ms. Daisy Enright on Our Miss Brooks, Mary Jane Lewis on The Lucy Show and Here's Lucy, and Clara Randolph on The Adventures of Ozzie and Harriet.
 Jim Davis: basketball player for University of Colorado, selected 27th overall in 1964 NBA Draft, played for Atlanta Hawks, Houston Rockets and Detroit Pistons.
 Ryan Kerrigan: linebacker for NFL's Washington Redskins, former Muncie Central and Purdue standout, selected 16th by Washington in 2011 NFL Draft
 William "Pete" Lee: Super Heavyweight Greco-Roman wrestler in 1976 Summer Olympics, placed 5th
 Ray McCallum: two-time state basketball champion at Muncie Central; one of only two retired basketball jerseys for Ball State; selected by Indiana Pacers in 1983 NBA draft; head basketball coach of University of Detroit 2008-16
 Bonzi Wells: basketball player for NBA's Portland Trail Blazers, Memphis Grizzlies, Sacramento Kings, Houston Rockets and New Orleans Hornets
 Ryan Kerrigan: Football player drafted Round 1: Pick 16 to the NFL's Washington Commanders, also played for the Philadelphia Eagles for 1 season before announcing retirement after the 2021 season.

See also
 List of high schools in Indiana

References

External links
 
Muncie Community Schools High School Consolidation Records Archives and Special Collections, Ball State University Libraries (PDF)
Muncie High School Consolidation Oral History Project Digital Media Repository, Ball State University Libraries

Educational institutions established in 1868
Public high schools in Indiana
Schools in Delaware County, Indiana
Buildings and structures in Muncie, Indiana
Education in Muncie, Indiana
1868 establishments in Indiana